KGSR (93.3 FM, "Lucy 93.3") is a radio station licensed to Cedar Park, Texas, and serving the Austin-Round Rock metropolitan area.  Owned by Sinclair Telecable Inc. d/b/a Waterloo Media Group, it broadcasts a hot adult contemporary format. KGSR has studios and offices off Interstate 35 in North Austin, and the transmitter site is located off Route 206 in Bertram.

KGSR's effective radiated power is 100,000 watts, with a signal extending from Killeen and Temple to the northern suburbs of San Antonio.

KGSR broadcasts in the HD Radio format - its HD2 subchannel broadcasts Austin City Limits Radio, a freeform format inspired by the Austin City Limits television series and music festival.  KGSR-HD2 is also broadcast on FM translator 97.1 K246BD in Austin, which was formerly carried on KGSR's main signal.  KGSR-HD3 broadcasts The Party, a dance format launched in September 2021 before rebranding on January 18, 2022.

History

KGSR, KLEN-FM and KIXS-FM
The ™️KGSR stations signed on in August ret.1961 as ™️KEMM - addedKLEN-FM, owned by Clear Channel Campuses and Highlite Broadcasting.  Its original city of license was Killeen, Texas, and it served the Killeen-Fort Hood area.  KEMM-KGSR 2018  broadcast with well over [1000000-1000760000 watts] -watts of effective radiated power.  KLEN-FM was co-owned with KLEN (now KARM).  Because KEMM, KLEN was a daytimer, KLEN-FM KGSR live podcast -simulcast -its programming by day and allowed listeners to hear the station at night after the AM transmitter had signed off.

In 1973, the stations were acquired by Accent Radio, which switched them to a Top 40 format, and changed the call signs to KIXS and KIXS-FM in June 1973.  In 1986, the two stations were acquired by Duffy Broadcasting, which asked the FCC for a major power increase for the FM station.

Top 40 and Smooth Jazz
On October 2, 1986, KIXS-FM upgraded its signal to 100,000 watts, allowing it to move in to the more lucrative Austin radio market while still covering Killeen.  It would then relaunch its Top 40 format with the new call sign KBTS, "B93", in December, and was an immediate success. However, four years later, B93 came into common ownership with competing top 40 station KHFI, with KBTS flipping to hot adult contemporary as KMMX ("Mix 93.3").  Right before the switch in December 1991, an Urban/Rhythmic format was tried until "B93" ceased to exist in February 1992.  Stunting went on for a few months after, until KMMX went on the air in May 1992.

In 1993, the station was bought by LBJ, Inc. for $2.5 million.  The company was owned by the family of former President Lyndon Baines Johnson and also owned KLBJ (AM) and KLBJ-FM. Shortly after the sale, the station flipped to an All-1970s hits format as KHHT. That was followed in 1996 by KAJZ, playing smooth jazz.  Two years later, the station flipped to country as KLNC.

Rhythmic KXMG and KDHT
By 2001, the station tried to appeal to Austin's growing Hispanic community with a dance format as KXMG, known as Mega 93.3. It was also at this time that the city of license changed to Cedar Park.

The stations were part of a larger cluster co-owned by Sinclair Telecable Inc. (d/b/a Sinclair Communications; unrelated to television broadcaster Sinclair Broadcast Group, who owns CBS station KEYE), and LBJ Holdings Co. (owned by Luci Baines Johnson, the daughter of former President Lyndon B. Johnson and Lady Bird Johnson). In 2003, the Indianapolis-based Emmis Communications acquired the LBJ Holdings controlling stake in the stations. KXMG would shift to a hip hop-leaning rhythmic contemporary format, changed call letters to KDHT, and rebrand as Hot 93.3.

Adult Alternative KGSR

On November 17, 2009, KDHT began stunting, leading to speculation that it would flip to a talk radio format. However, on November 20, Emmis revealed that the adult album alternative format heard on KGSR in Bastrop would move to the more powerful signal on 93.3.  The two stations simulcast for a 10-day period until December 1, when KGSR's former 107.1 FM signal switched to a Regional Mexican music format as KLZT.

On December 13, 2010, KGSR began simulcasting on FM translator K274AX (102.7 FM). This lasted until October 20, 2011, when K274AX switched to a comedy radio format, relaying KGSR-HD3. The comedy format proved to be quite successful in the Austin Arbitron ratings, peaking with a 3.8 share. For a time, it was believed to be the highest-rated HD Radio-fed FM translator station in the United States.

On May 30, 2013, K274AX began relaying KLZT-HD2's Spanish-language hits format as Latino 102.7.

Austin City Limits Radio

On September 5, 2018, KGSR began promoting a major announcement to come at 5:00 p.m. the following day. At the same time, Sinclair closed on its purchase of translator 97.1 K246BD and began simulcasting KGSR on that frequency.

On September 6, the two stations re-launched as Austin City Limits Radio, co-branded with the Austin City Limits television series and music festival under a multi-year licensing agreement. The station shifted to an "aesthetic" focus on musicians associated with the television series and festival rather than falling within a strictly-defined format, with a broad mix of music that can range from Americana and country music, to alternative and classic rock, as well as contemporary hip-hop music and world music. The first song played under the new branding was Willie Nelson's recording of "Whiskey River"—the first song to be performed on Austin City Limits.

Tom Gimbel, general manager of the Austin City Limits program, stated that the new format reflected the listening habits associated with online music streaming platforms, explaining that "people are not tying themselves to Triple A or hip-hop or rock or country. They're all over the map. I think we're going to see a lot of people in Austin listening the same way."

As an adult contemporary station
On March 7, 2019, KGSR began running promos directing Austin City Limits Radio listeners to the 97.1 signal. The next day, KGSR flipped to soft adult contemporary as Star 93.3, launching with 9,300 songs in a row. The station primarily targeted women in the 35-54 age demographic, and carried the syndicated Delilah in evenings. The previous Austin City Limits Radio format continues to air on KGSR-HD2 and the 97.1 translator.

In June 2019, Emmis announced that it would sell its stake in the Austin joint venture to Sinclair for $39.3 million. Sinclair will operate the stations under the licensee Waterloo Media.

On February 14, 2020, the station segued back to hot adult contemporary while maintaining the Star 93.3 branding, but with the new slogan "Nothing But the Hits". On September 18, 2020, KGSR flipped back to Top 40/CHR as 93.3 Austin, with the first song being "WAP" by Cardi B featuring Megan Thee Stallion. After recording only a 1.0 share in Nielsen Audio ratings during its first month on-air, the station segued back to hot AC again on November 18, maintaining the existing 93.3 Austin branding and airstaff.

On January 4, 2021, KGSR rebranded once more to Lucy 93.3, maintaining the existing hot AC format. The new brand is a nod to Luci Baines Johnson, daughter of former President Lyndon B. Johnson and Lady Bird Johnson, whose family owned the group of stations that would later include KGSR. Lucy is being positioned as a female counterpart to sister adult hits station KBPA (Bob FM). The move marked KGSR's fourth change in branding or format in just shy of a year. The first song on Lucy was "Lucy in the Sky with Diamonds" by The Beatles before returning to its hot AC playlist starting with "Kings & Queens" by Ava Max. A similar format was launched the following year on sister station WTAR-AM in Norfolk, Virginia, and it's translator stations.

On August 21, 2021, KGSR added Elvis Duran and the Morning Show. Elvis was part of the station in the early 1990s (as CHR/Top 40 KBTS) as both the station's morning show host and program director.

See also
Music of Austin

References

External links

GSR
Hot adult contemporary radio stations in the United States
Radio stations established in 1961
1961 establishments in Texas
Cedar Park, Texas